The 2020–21 Northeastern Huskies Men's ice hockey season was the 89th season of play for the program and the 37th season in the Hockey East conference. The Huskies represented Northeastern University and were coached by Jim Madigan, in his 10th season.

Season
As a result of the ongoing COVID-19 pandemic the entire college ice hockey season was delayed. Because the NCAA had previously announced that all winter sports athletes would retain whatever eligibility they possessed through at least the following year, none of Northeastern's players would lose a season of play. However, the NCAA also approved a change in its transfer regulations that would allow players to transfer and play immediately rather than having to sit out a season, as the rules previously required.

The Huskies' season began even later than most of their contemporaries, with the first game coming in mid-December. Northeastern was unable to establish any kind of consistency all season with one exception; when NEU played a ranked team, they wouldn't win. The Huskies went 0–7–2 against top-20 opponents during the season and 9–2–1 versus all others. The team's lack of success in such games would lead them to be dropped from the rankings for the first time all season after their early exit from the Hockey East Tournament. With no ranking, a .500 record and a low PairWise score, Northeastern had no real chance to be selected for the NCAA Tournament.

Billy Carrabino, Devon Levi and Nick Scarpa sat out the season.

Departures

Recruiting

Roster
As of September 2, 2020.

Standings

Schedule and Results

|-
!colspan=12 style=";" | Regular Season

|-
!colspan=12 style=";" |

Scoring statistics

Goaltending statistics

Rankings

USCHO did not release a poll in week 20.

Awards and honors

References

2020–21
2020–21 Hockey East men's ice hockey season
2020–21 NCAA Division I men's ice hockey by team
2020–21 in American ice hockey by team
2021 in sports in Massachusetts
2020 in sports in Massachusetts